Dance International is a print and online magazine for members of the International Dance Teachers Association. www. idta.co.uk

The same title is also used by a Canadian online magazine .

Dance International is a nonprofit arts magazine published four times a year by the Vancouver Ballet Society and distributed worldwide. It will not publish print issues from the end of 2019.

Each issue offers coverage of the international ballet and contemporary dance scene through feature articles, news, obituaries and reviews (dance, books, films, DVDs), with particular emphasis on Canadian artists, companies, photographers and writers. It is the longest continuously-published dance title in Canada (since 1976); it was originally called Vandance but was renamed to Dance International in 1993 to better reflect its increasingly global editorial scope. Its website has an online store where it is possible to order back issues and subscribe to the magazine, and offers a preview of the latest magazine content.

References 
Dance International's website
Vancouver Ballet Society's website
International Dance Teachers Association website

1976 establishments in British Columbia
Dance magazines
Magazines established in 1976
Magazines published in Vancouver
Music magazines published in Canada
Quarterly magazines published in Canada